Önningeby is a village in Jomala Municipality on the Finnish island of Åland. It is located some 7 km (4 mi) northeast of Mariehamn. Önningeby has 214 inhabitants (2014). In the south of Önningeby, Lemström's canal separates the municipalities of Jomala and Lemland.

In the late 19th century, Önningeby became popular with artists wishing to practice painting en plein air, i.e in the open air rather than in their studios. The Önningeby artists colony was centred around the summer house bought by the Finnish landscape painter Victor Westerholm in 1884. Since 1992, Ålands Konstmuseum (Åland's Art Museum) has presented a permanent exhibition of works by the artists who painted there.

References

Villages in Finland
Geography of Åland